Josué Alex Mukendi (born in Kinshasa) is a politician in the Democratic Republic of the Congo and was a candidate in the 2011 presidential election. He resides in Mont Ngafula, and filed for candidacy 28 November 2011.

Sources
Josué Alex Mukendi

Living people
People from Kinshasa
Democratic Republic of the Congo politicians
Candidates for President of the Democratic Republic of the Congo
Year of birth missing (living people)
21st-century Democratic Republic of the Congo people